Doniphan High School can refer to:

Doniphan High School (Nebraska) in Doniphan, Nebraska
Doniphan High School (Missouri) in Doniphan, Missouri